Moosonee station is a railway station in Moosonee, Ontario, Canada operated by the Ontario Northland Railway. It is the northern terminus of Ontario Northland's Polar Bear Express, located about 12 miles (19 km) south of the shore of James Bay on the north bank of the Moose River. It consists of a single storey station building, sheds, and a small train yard. 

The station is located on Arena Road, which marks the northern boundary of the townsite. Directly southeast of the station lie the Moosonee Arena, Super 8 by Wyndham hotel, Moosonee Public School and the Moosonee Campus of Northern College. 

As of April 2021, the train operates four days per week, with an afternoon arrival and early evening departure on Monday, Tuesday, Thursday, and Friday.

Moosonee is a base for cargo shipping to settlements not already served by the railroad. Tracks run past the station out to the Moosonee Airport with a siding along the Moose River (beside Revillon Road North) for bringing freight to barges. Box cars are stored at the terminus until trains run south for the return trip to North Bay or Toronto.

The station was built in the 1960s and renovated with new sidings in 2009. The first station in Moosonee was built in 1932 by the then Temiskaming and Northern Ontario Railway.

The MV Niska I passenger-vehicle and freight ferry operated by the Owen Sound Transportation Company connects Moosonee to Moose Factory across the river on a seasonal basis.

Moosonee station is one of only two train stations in Canada located near Hudson Bay. The other is Churchill station, located several hundred kilometers to the northwest on the shore of Hudson Bay in northern Manitoba.

See also
Moosonee Airport 
Moosonee Water Aerodrome

References

External links
Travelling on the Train: Polar Bear Express (Ontario Northland)
Moosonee station train (Via Rail)
Polar Bear Express service map

Moosonee
Ontario Northland Railway stations
Railway stations in Cochrane District